Desaparecidos is a Spanish term for the victims of the crime of enforced disappearance.

Desaparecidos may also refer to:

 Desaparecidos del franquismo, forced disappearances during and after the Spanish Civil War
 
 Desaparecidos (band), an American rock band
 Desaparecidos (film), a 2011 Brazilian film
 Desaparecidos (American TV series)
 Desaparecidos (Spanish TV series)